The Australian Film Future Foundation is a not-for-profit arts organization, which works to restore and digitise Australian screen content.

The Australian Film Future Foundation was established to grant monies to filmmakers and content owners who need to transfer, restore, repair, regrade and digitise their feature-length films (over 60 minutes). Many filmmakers or their descendents cannot afford the thousands of dollars, and in some cases tens of thousands, to carry their films forward into the future.

References

External links

Film preservation organizations
Arts organisations based in Australia